The Society of the Precious Blood is an Anglican religious order of contemplative sisters with convents in England, Lesotho and South Africa. The sisters follow the Rule of St Augustine.

History

The Order dates its history from 1905 when Mother Millicent Mary SPB (formerly Millicent Taylor) took vows in the parish of St Jude, Birmingham. The community which formed around her became established, living in King's Heath, Birmingham  and in 1916 it moved to Burnham Abbey near Maidenhead, where it is still based today, living an enclosed community life, within the Diocese of Oxford. Built in 1266, Burnham Abbey had been a house of Augustinian Canonesses until the Reformation. 

In 1957 a group of five sisters established a priory in the Kingdom of Lesotho. This in 1966 become an autonomous province of the Order and spread into South Africa in 1980.

The foundress
Millicent Taylor was born in India in 1869; her father, Reynell Taylor was an army officer. At the age of 22, she declared her wish for the religious life but became a parish worker in poor parishes in east London, Reading and Birmingham. In 1905, she made her first profession on St Luke's Day, 1905, in St Jude's Church, Birmingham. She resigned as Superior in 1942 because of ill health and died in 1956.

Structure

SPB United Kingdom
An elected Reverend Mother presides over the sisters.
 Burnham Abbey, Maidenhead, is the only convent

SPB Africa
An elected Prioress presides over the African sisters, whose convents are:
 Priory of Our Lady Mother of Mercy, Maseru, Lesotho
 St Monica's House of Prayer, Kimberley, South Africa

See also
 Augustinian nuns in the Anglican Communion

References

External links
 Community website

Anglican orders and communities
Christian religious orders established in the 20th century
1905 establishments in England